Berlin Bundesplatz  is a railway station in the Wilmersdorf district of Berlin.

The underground station opened in 1971 was built by R.G. Rümmler next to a highway tunnel. There is no direct connection between the two directions of the subways because the platforms are located on the right of each highway direction.
Mentionable is the different color scheme on the stations heading north–south. On one are blue and white panels and on the other beige/white panels. The station was renovated in 2004.

Notes 

Berlin S-Bahn stations
U9 (Berlin U-Bahn) stations
Buildings and structures in Charlottenburg-Wilmersdorf
Berlin Bundesplatz